Duncanville may refer to:

Places
 Duncanville, Alabama, USA; an unincorporated community
 Duncanville, Illinois, USA; an unincorporated community
 Duncanville, Texas, USA; a city
 Duncanville Independent School District
 Duncanville High School
 Duncanville Air Force Station

Other uses
 Duncanville (TV series), an American animated sitcom

See also

 Duncan (disambiguation)
 Ville (disambiguation)